The 2014–15 Football League Championship was the 130th season in the history of Millwall Football Club. It was their 89th season in the Football League and 40th in the second tier of English football. It was Millwall's fifth continuous season in the Championship, after promotion from the Football League One in 2010.

Statistics

Appearances & goals
Update 05.03.2015

|}

Top scorers

Disciplinary record

Match details

Pre-season and friendlies

Football League Championship

August

September

October

November

December

January

February

March

April

FA Cup

Football League Cup

Sky Bet Championship

League table

Results summary

Results by round

Transfers

In

Out

Loans in

Loans out

References

External links
Official Website

Millwall F.C. seasons
Millwall